Angolans people in the United Kingdom includes British citizens and non-citizen immigrants and expatriates of Angolan descent in the United Kingdom.

Demographics
The 2001 Census recorded 5,914 Angolan-born people residing in the UK. According to the 2011 UK Census, there were 14,086 Angolan-born residents in England, 167 in Wales, 314 in Scotland, and 52 in Northern Ireland. Of this total of 14,619 Angolan-born residents, 8,263 lived in Greater London, 1,331 in North West England and 924 in the West Midlands.

Notable people

References

African diaspora in the United Kingdom
Immigration to the United Kingdom by country of origin